Christmas Ain't About Me is a Christmas EP released by the nerd-folk duo The Doubleclicks on December 1, 2012.

Track listing 

2012 Christmas albums
2012 EPs
The Doubleclicks albums
Christmas albums by American artists
Christmas EPs
Folk Christmas albums